Munditia suteri is a minute sea snail, a marine gastropod mollusc in the family Liotiidae.

Description
The height of the shell attains 1.5 mm, its diameter 3 mm. This marine spêcies is endemic to the Bounty Islands, New Zealand.

References

 Powell A. W. B., New Zealand Mollusca, William Collins Publishers Ltd, Auckland, New Zealand 1979

External links
 Museum of New Zealand: Munditia suteri

suteri
Gastropods of New Zealand
Gastropods described in 1919